Perspectives in Public Health (PPH) is a bi-monthly, peer-reviewed, academic journal that publishes papers in the field of public health. It is practice orientated and is published on behalf of the Royal Society for Public Health by SAGE Publications.

History 
Perspectives in Public Health has been published under this existing name since 2008, when the Royal Society for Public Health (RSPH) was formed. It was originally established in 1879 under the title The Journal of the Royal Society for the Promotion of Health, on behalf of The Royal Society of Health, also known as the Royal Society for the Promotion of Health. This organisation merged with the Royal Institute of Public Health in 2008, forming the RSPH, and consequently the journal was renamed. The full archive of the journal, dating back to 1879, is available to view online.

Scope 
PPH'''s primary aim is to be an invaluable resource for the Society's members, who are health-promoting professionals from many disciplines. Additionally PPH appeals to practitioners and policy makers, researchers and academics. The journal’s content reflects the broad range of areas member’s are interested in, including environmental health, health protection, health and safety, food safety and nutrition, building and engineering, primary care, academia and government. 

Due to its practice orientated nature the journal features current topics and opinions; news and views on current health issues; case studies; book reviews; letters to the Editor; as well as updates on RSPH's work. The journal also commissions articles for themed issues and publishes original peer-reviewed articles.

The journal publishes four themed issues and two un-themed issues a year. Previous themes have included Health literacy, Obesity, Innovation and Food Safety. Themes are pre-decided by the Editorial Board, overseen by the journal’s honorary editor Heather Hartwell (Bournemouth University).

 Abstracting and indexing Perspectives in Public Health is abstracted and indexed in, among other databases:  SCOPUS, and the Social Sciences Citation Index. According to the Journal Citation Reports, its 2013 impact factor is 1.035, ranking it 98 out of 136 journals in the category "Public, Environmental & Occupational Health (SSCI)". 

 Significant content 
Due to its long history, PPH is able to reveal the changing shape of public health since 1879. The full archive of the journal is available to view online.PPH''’s most highly cited paper in 2014 was by Amelia Lake and Tim Townshend, ‘Obesogenic environments: exploring the built and food environments'. The most highly cited paper in 2014 was 'Developing a physical activity legacy from the London 2012 Olympic and Paralympic Games: a policy-led systematic review'. 

In March 2012 the journal published a special issue on the Olympic Legacy to explore some of the issues surrounding the London 2012 Olympic Games and Paralympic Games.

References

External links 
 
 RSPH Official Website
PPH podcast

SAGE Publishing academic journals
English-language journals